Andersson's Kalle (Swedish: Anderssonskans Kalle) is a 1950 Swedish comedy film directed by Rolf Husberg and starring  Kai Gullmar, Harriet Andersson and Rut Holm. The film's sets were designed by the art director Bibi Lindström. It is based on the novel of the same title by Emil Norlander, which has been adapted into films on several occasions.

Synopsis
Kalle is a young boy from the Södermalm district of Stockholm who love playing practical jokes. His widowed mother feels that he is just showing youthful high spirits but others in the neighbourhood, including the local police officer, strongly disagree. Meanwhile, his elder sister Majken is being courted by two suitors.

Cast
 Peter Blitz as 	Anderssonskans Kalle
 Kai Gullmar as 	Anderssonskan
 Harriet Andersson as 	Majken 
 Mona Geijer-Falkner as 	Bobergskan
 Rut Holm as Pihlgrenskan
 Bellan Roos as 	Lövdalskan
 Hanny Schedin as Petterssonskan
 Arne Källerud as Konstapel Jonsson
 Lars Ekborg as Gustav
 Henrik Schildt as Helling
 John Botvid as Korv-Agust
 Artur Rolén as Kol-Karlsson
 Bo Lennart Olsson as 	Allan 
 Sven Magnusson as Jocke 
 Wiktor Andersson as 	Fish Poacher 
 Percy Brandt as 	Allan Berg 
 Bertil Bronner as 	Helling's Companion 
 Knut Frankman as Fisherman 
 Lars Hummerhielm as	Pelle 
 Stig Johanson as 	Erik 
 Magnus Kesster as 	Editor 
 Torsten Lilliecrona as 	Helling's Companion 
 Carl-Gustaf Lindstedt as 	Illegal Fisher 
 Emy Storm as 	Lady at Party 
 Bengt Sundmark as 	Crook 
 Carin Swensson as 	Maria Jansson 
 Tom Walter as Crook 
 Ingrid Östergren as Summer Camp Manager

References

Bibliography 
 Qvist, Per Olov & von Bagh, Peter. Guide to the Cinema of Sweden and Finland. Greenwood Publishing Group, 2000.
Segrave, Kerry & Martin, Linda.  The Continental Actress: European Film Stars of the Postwar Era--biographies, Criticism, Filmographies, Bibliographies. McFarland, 1990.

External links 
 

1950 films
Swedish comedy films
1950 comedy films
1950s Swedish-language films
Films directed by Rolf Husberg
Films based on Swedish novels
Remakes of Swedish films
Films set in Stockholm
1950s Swedish films